Jennifer Clare Jones is an American radiation oncologist and biologist. She is an investigator and head of the translational nanobiology section at the National Cancer Institute.

Education 
Jones completed a M.D. and Ph.D. from Stanford University. She is a board-certified radiation oncologist specialized training in radiosurgery, with graduate and postdoctoral training in both cancer biology and general immunology. Jones' dissertation in 2001 was titled, Identification of Tapr, a T cell and airway phenotype regulatory locus, and positional cloning of the Tim gene family.

Career and research 
Jones is a NIH Stadtman Investigator and head of the translational nanobiology section at the National Cancer Institute.

From 2001 to 2003, Jones positionally cloned the T-cell immunoglobulin mucin (TIM) gene family and demonstrated the genetic association between TIMs and immune response profiles. As a radiation oncologist, her research is focused on developing immune-based therapies that synergize with radiation to produce optimal anti-tumor immune responses. Jones develops improved methods to characterize, sort, and perform functional studies of nanoparticles, and has established a translational EV analysis pipeline, with instrumentation for preparation, analysis, counting, and cytometric study of extracellular vesicles.

References 

Living people
Year of birth missing (living people)
Place of birth missing (living people)
Stanford University School of Medicine alumni
National Institutes of Health people
21st-century American women physicians
21st-century American physicians
21st-century American women scientists
21st-century American biologists
American women biologists
American medical researchers
Women medical researchers
American oncologists
Radiation therapy
Cell biologists
American molecular biologists
Women molecular biologists
Women oncologists
Cancer researchers